This was the first edition of the tournament.

Maxime Cressy won the title after defeating Mikael Torpegaard 6–7(4–7), 7–6(8–6), 6–3 in the final.

Seeds
All seeds receive a bye into the second round.

Draw

Finals

Top half

Section 1

Section 2

Bottom half

Section 3

Section 4

References
Main draw
Qualifying draw

2019 ATP Challenger Tour
Cleveland Open